Arisa Takada (高田ありさ Takada Arisa, born February 17, 1987) is a Japanese volleyball player who plays for Toray Arrows.

Clubs
  Kyushubunka high school
  Toray Arrows (2005-)

Awards

Team 
2007 Domestic Sports Festival (Volleyball) -  Champion, with Toray Arrows.
2007-2008 Empress's Cup -   Champion, with Toray Arrows.
2007-2008 V.Premier League -  Champion, with Toray Arrows.
2008 Domestic Sports Festival -  Runner-Up, with Toray Arrows.
2008-2009 V.Premier League -  Champion, with Toray Arrows.
2009 Kurowashiki All Japan Volleyball Championship -  Champion, with Toray Arrows.
2009-2010 V.Premier League -  Champion, with Toray Arrows.
2010 Kurowashiki All Japan Volleyball Championship -  Champion, with Toray Arrows.
2010-11 V.Premier League -  Runner-up, with Toray Arrows.

National team
 2014 FIVB World Grand Prix -  Silver medal

References

External links
 Toray Arrows Women's Volleyball Team

Japanese women's volleyball players
1987 births
Living people
Sportspeople from Nagasaki Prefecture